Ivo Miro Jović (born 15 July 1950) is a Bosnian Croat former politician who served as the 5th Croat member of the Presidency of Bosnia and Herzegovina from 2005 to 2006.

He was a member of both the national House of Peoples and House of Representatives. Jović has been a member of the Croatian Democratic Union since 1990.

Early career
After Jović had graduated as a history teacher from the University of Sarajevo, he worked as a teacher in Ilijaš and Kiseljak. He became active in politics in 1997, as the Croatian Democratic Union (HDZ BiH) had proposed him for a government position in the Central Bosnia Canton. In 1999, Jović entered the Federal Government as Deputy Minister of Culture, where he remained until 2001. Following the 2002 general election, he was elected as a representative for his party in the national House of Representatives.

Presidency (2005–2006)
On 9 May 2005, Jović was appointed to the post of member of the Presidency of Bosnia and Herzegovina by Parliament, following the sacking of Dragan Čović by the High Representative for Bosnia and Herzegovina on charges of corruption. As Presidency member, he attended the 2005 World Summit in New York City between 14 and 16 September. 

At the 2006 general election, Jović was defeated in the race for a second term as the Croat member of the Presidency by Željko Komšić of the Social Democratic Party (SDP BiH). Komšić's victory was widely attributed to a split in the HDZ BiH, enabling SDP BiH to win a majority of the Bosniaks votes. Croats see Komšić as their illegitimate representative because he was elected mostly by Bosniak voters.

While serving in the Presidency, Jović was also as its chairman for most of his term.

Later career
Following his presidency, Jović served as the Croat and HDZ BiH's representative in the national House of Peoples from 14 March 2007 until 9 June 2011.

In 2013, he was appointed as an advisor to then Deputy Defence Minister Marina Pendeš. In 2015, she was charged by the State Prosecutor's Office for paying Jović a salary despite him not showing up to work. In February 2016, she was acquitted by the Court of Bosnia and Herzegovina of the charges.

Personal life
Jović is fluent in German, married and father of three children.

References

External links
 
Ivo Miro Jović - Chairman, Bosnia and Herzegovina Presidency at Southeast European Times

1950 births
Living people
People from Čapljina
Croats of Bosnia and Herzegovina
University of Sarajevo alumni
University of Rijeka alumni
Croatian Democratic Union of Bosnia and Herzegovina politicians
Members of the Presidency of Bosnia and Herzegovina
Chairmen of the Presidency of Bosnia and Herzegovina
Members of the House of Representatives (Bosnia and Herzegovina)
Members of the House of Peoples of Bosnia and Herzegovina